Candalides grandissima is a species of butterfly of the family Lycaenidae. It is found in New Guinea.

Subspecies
Candalides grandissima grandissima (southern New Guinea to Papua New Guinea)
Candalides grandissima morobea Wind & Clench, 1947 (New Guinea: Morobe district)

References

Butterflies described in 1908
Candalidini